The 2018 South American Rhythmic Gymnastics Championships were held in Melgar, Colombia, October 22–29, 2018. The competition was organized by the Colombian Gymnastics Federation.

Participating nations

Medal summary

Senior

Medal table

Senior

References 

2018 in gymnastics
Rhythmic Gymnastics,2017
International gymnastics competitions hosted by Colombia
2018 in Colombian sport